La Voix is a francophone Canadian reality talent show as part of the international television series franchise The Voice, based on the original Dutch version of the program created by John de Mol. The series is part of The Voice franchise and is based on a similar competition format in The Netherlands entitled The Voice of Holland. The series is structured into three phases: blind auditions, battles, and live performance shows. In 2016, La Voix also launched a separate series for younger contestants called La Voix Junior.

Format

Producers' Auditions and The Blind Auditions
The first stage of La Voix is the producer's auditions, which are not shown on television. The first televised stage is the blind auditions, where the contestants sing in front of the coaches. The coaches have their backs to the singer and if they like what they hear; they can press their button to turn around and recruit them to their team. If more than one coach turns the power shifts to the singer, who then decides which team they would like to be part of. Each coach must recruit 12 singers to their team in the blind auditions to progress onto the battle phase. Starting on season seven, a new twist is added, the 'block'. Each coach can press the button with the name of another coach to avoid that coach from getting an artist.

The Duels: Top 48
The Duels oppose two participants from the same team. To prepare, participants are helped and advised not only by their coach but also by mentors. After the duet performance, the coach determines the participant who will move on to the next stage. The other coaches will be able to steal an unsuccessful candidate. They can only use this privilege twice. At the end of the Duels, each team will have 8 participants.

The Chants de Bataille: Top 32
Among the eight artists composing their teams, the coaches will choose five participants who will go directly to the Directs. The other three will have to go through the Chants de Bataille stage to access Directs. Only one will succeed.

The Directs
At the four Directs, from the quarterfinals to the Grand Final, the audience and the coaches determine who will continue the competition.

Final: Top 4
At this stage, there are only 4 participants left to become the big winner of the series. The public will have the choice, and it is he/she alone who will vote to determine La Voix.

Coaches and hosts

Coaches' advisors

Season summary
Warning: the following table presents a significant amount of different colors.

Coaches' teams
  Winner
  Runner-up
  Third place
  Fourth place
 First names listed are the finalists: winners in bold and other finalists in italic.

La Voix Junior
La Voix Junior was the French-Canadian version of The Voice Kids. It premiered on October 2, 2016, on TVA. The coaches were Marc Dupré, Marie-Mai, and Alex Nevsky. All three coaches returned for season 2, in 2017. In February 2018, it was reported that La Voix Junior would be replaced by a dance competition called Révolution.

References

External links
Official website

 
TVA (Canadian TV network) original programming
2013 Canadian television series debuts
2010s Canadian reality television series
Television shows filmed in Montreal
Television productions suspended due to the COVID-19 pandemic